Days of Our Lives: Beyond Salem is an American soap opera limited series. It is a spin-off of the flagship Days of Our Lives television series. It premiered on Peacock on September 6, 2021, with a daily episode through September 10, 2021. Beyond Salem: Chapter 2, a second season of five episodes, premiered on July 11, 2022.

Premise
The series follows the adventures of current and former characters of Days of Our Lives outside of Salem, Illinois.

Cast

Main
 Deidre Hall as Marlena Evans (seasons 1–2)
 Drake Hogestyn as John Black (seasons 1–2)
 James Reynolds as Abe Carver (season 1)
 Jackée Harry as Paulina Price (season 1)
 Robert Scott Wilson as Ben Weston (seasons 1–2)
 Victoria Konefal as Ciara Brady (seasons 1–2)
 Sal Stowers as Lani Price-Grant (season 1)
 Lamon Archey as Eli Grant (season 1)
 Chandler Massey as Will Horton (season 1)
 Billy Flynn as Chad DiMera (season 1)
 Zach Tinker as Sonny Kiriakis (season 1)
 Thaao Penghlis as Tony DiMera (season 1)
 Leann Hunley as Anna DiMera (season 1)
 Charles Shaughnessy as Shane Donovan / Drew Donovan (season 1)
 Peter Porte as Kyle Graham (season 1)
 Kristian Alfonso as Hope Williams Brady (season 2)
 Peter Reckell as Bo Brady (season 2)
 Steve Burton as Harris Michaels (season 2)
 Mary Beth Evans as Kayla Brady Johnson (season 2)
 Stephen Nichols as Steve Johnson (season 2)
 Christopher Sean as Paul Narita (season 2)
 Colton Little as Andrew Donovan (season 2)
 Camila Banus as Gabi Hernandez (season 2)
 Remington Hoffman as Li Shin (season 2)
 Miranda Wilson as Megan Hathaway (season 2)
 Lucas Adams as Tripp Dalton (season 2)

 Lisa Rinna as Billie Reed (season 1)
 Eileen Davidson as Kristen DiMera (season 1), Thomas Banks (season 2) and Sister Mary Moira Banks (season 2)
 Loretta Devine as Angela (season 2)

Supporting
 Christie Clark as Carrie Brady Reed (season 1)
 Austin Peck as Austin Reed (season 1)
 Greg Rikaart as Leo Stark (season 1)
 Abigail Klein as Stephanie Johnson (season 2)
 Tanner Stine as Joey Johnson (season 2)
 Victoria Grace as Wendy Shin (season 2)

Guest
 Jackie Cox as herself (season 1)
 Adrienne Frantz as Sophie Faversham (season 1)
 Scott Bailey as Miles Faversham (season 1)
 Roxy Wood as Cori Blake (season 1)
 Enya Flack as Michelle White (season 1)
 Noah Huntley as Lord Sebastian Alamain (season 1)
 Vince Van Patten as Phil Hellworth (season 2)
 Josh Taylor as Chris Kositchek (season 2)
 Andrew Masset as Judge Welch (season 2)
 Scott Shilstone as Zack Brady (season 2)

Episodes

Season 1 (2021)
An investigation into some stolen jewels is the focus of this season set in locations such as Phoenix, New Orleans, Miami and Zurich, Switzerland.

Season 2 (2022)
An investigation into who is trying to unite three magical prisms is the focus of this season set in locations such as Montreal, Seattle, San Francisco, Monte Carlo, Caracas, and Hong Kong.

Production
It was announced in July 2021 that Peacock had ordered a five-episode miniseries spinoff of Days of Our Lives, which would see current and former actors star, including Rinna, Hall and Reynolds, among others. Additional castings, including Davidson and Penghlis, were announced the following month. Filming had commenced by August 2021. 

A second chapter of five episodes was announced in April 2022, premiered from July 11 to 15. The casting of Kristian Alfonso and Peter Reckell was announced with it. Steve Burton was later announced to have joined the second chapter in the role of Harris Michaels. On June 2, 2022, it was announced that Davidson, Christopher Sean, Vince Van Patten, and Loretta Devine had also been cast.

Soundtrack
The soundtrack for Beyond Salem: Chapter 2 was released on July 15, 2022.

Accolades

References

External links
 
 

2020s American drama television miniseries
2021 American television series debuts
Days of Our Lives
2020s American LGBT-related drama television series
American television soap operas
American television spin-offs
English-language television shows
Peacock (streaming service) original programming
Television series by Sony Pictures Television